Phi Delta Phi is an international legal honor society and the oldest legal organization in continuous existence in the United States. Phi Delta Phi was originally a professional fraternity but became an honor society in 2012.

The fraternity was founded at the University of Michigan in 1869 "to promote a higher standard of professional ethics".

History 
Phi Delta Phi Fraternity was founded in the law department of the University of Michigan by John M. Howard of the class of 1871.  Howard was a graduate of Monmouth College and member of Phi Gamma Delta (FIJI).  His initial intent was to found a chapter of FIJI at the University, but he did not follow through with the plan because of the large number of chapters already in place on the campus.  Howard instead turned his efforts toward founding a fraternity devoted purely to students of the legal profession.

Phi Delta Phi Inns have occasionally leased or owned residential buildings or secured meeting spaces, often adjacent to law libraries.  Even during WWII, when law school admissions enrollments virtually ceased, all the Fraternity's inns remained active on a restricted basis.  Thus, according to Baird's 20th, the fraternity sprang back to full strength "almost before the fighting had ceased."

The first international unit of the fraternity was the Weldon Inn, chartered in 1925 at Dalhousie University in Nova Scotia. The first unit in Mexico, the Velasco Inn, was chartered in 1973 at the Escuela Libre de Derecho, in Mexico City.

After 140 years of operation as a professional fraternity, the Fraternity was re-cast as an honor society in 2012.

Inns 

Phi Delta Phi has one hundred and thirty-one active chapters known as Inns. Each Inn is named for a noted jurist or member of the bar.

Kent Inn, University of Michigan, 1869
Sharswood Inn, University of Pennsylvania, 1875
Story Inn, Columbia University, 1881
Pomeroy Inn, University of California, Hastings College of the Law, 1883
Jay Inn, Albany Law School, 1884
Gibson-Alexander Inn, University of Pennsylvania, 1886
Choate Inn, Harvard University, 1887
Waite Inn, Yale University, 1887
Conkling Inn, Cornell University, 1888
Miller Inn, Stanford University, 1897
Douglas Inn, University of Chicago, 1903
Jones Inn, University of California, Berkeley, 1913

See also 
 Order of the Coif (honor society, law)
 The Order of Barristers (honor society, law; litigation)
 Alpha Phi Sigma (honor society, criminal justice)
 Lambda Epsilon Chi (honor society, paralegal)

 Professional fraternities and sororities

References 

 
Student organizations established in 1869
Legal organizations based in the United States
1869 establishments in Michigan
Former members of Professional Fraternity Association
Professional legal fraternities and sororities in the United States
Honor societies